Cabanis's wren (Cantorchilus modestus) is a species of bird in the family Troglodytidae. It is found in Belize, Costa Rica, El Salvador, Guatemala, Honduras, Mexico, and Nicaragua.

Taxonomy and systematics

Cabanis's wren, with what are now the canebrake wren (C. zeledoni) and the isthmian wren (C. elutus), were called the plain wren. The three were split from each other in 2016 on the basis of a 2015 publication that described their different vocalizations and genetic divergence. Cabanis's wren is monotypic according to the International Ornithological Committee (IOC) and the Clements taxonomy. However, BirdLife International (BLI) retains C. modestus as "plain wren" with elutus as a subspecies of it rather than as a full species.

Description

Adults have a dark gray-brown crown, a rufous-brown back, an orange-rufous rump, and a rufescent brown tail with narrow darker bars. They have a white supercilium, a gray-brown stripe behind the eye, and cheeks mottled gray-brown and gray-white. Their throat is white, the chest pale grayish buff, and the belly buffy white between orange-buff flanks. Individuals in the far northern part of the species' range tend to be darker and less rufous on the back. Immatures are a duller version of the adult.

Distribution and habitat

Cabanis's wren is found from the Mexican states of Oaxaca and Chiapas south through Belize, Guatemala, El Salvador, Honduras, and Nicaragua to the Pacific side of central Costa Rica. It inhabits both dry and humid areas, occurring in a variety of surroundings including forest edges, second growth, and gardens.

Behavior

Feeding

Cabanis's wren usually forages in pairs in low dense vegetation, though it occasionally will hunt higher in trees. Its diet is mostly insects and spiders.

Breeding

The nest of Cabanis's wren is roughly football-shaped with an entance hole on the side. It is constructed of grass and other vegetable fibers, lined with softer material, and placed in dense vegetation within  of the ground. The usual clutch size is two though clutches of three eggs are known.

Vocalization

The song of Cabanis's wren is "a loud motif of 3–4 clear whistles" . Its calls include a "harsh chur  and a "rippling, tinkling chi-cho-chi" .

Status

The IUCN has assessed Cabanis's wren as being of Least concern. It is common to abundant and does well in human-modified landscapes.

References

Further reading

Cabanis's wren
Birds of Central America
Birds of El Salvador
Cabanis's wren
Taxonomy articles created by Polbot